Beccles Town Football Club is an English football club based in Beccles, Suffolk. They are nicknamed 'The Wherrymen', because Beccles was once a busy trading town on the River Waveney. The club is affiliated to the Suffolk County FA and are currently members of the Anglian Combination Premier Division. They play at College Meadow.

They play an annual match against Beccles Caxton called the Hospital Cup. All proceeds from the match are donated to Beccles Hospital.

History
The club were established in 1919 as Beccles F.C.. They won the Suffolk Senior Cup in 1919–20 and 1921–22. They won the Suffolk Junior Cup in 1939, and the Suffolk Minor Cup in 1948 and 1949. They played in the FA Cup for seven seasons in the 1950s whilst members of the Norfolk & Suffolk League, reaching the third qualifying round three times. In 1952–53 they were Norfolk & Suffolk League champions. They joined the Anglian Combination when the Norfolk & Suffolk League merged with the East Anglian League in 1964. Beccles won the Anglian Combination Division Three in 1971–72, gaining promotion to Division Two. After finishing runners-up the following season the club reached Division One. The club finished runners-up in Division One in 1976–77 and again 1985–86. During this time, Beccles entered the FA Vase four times and reached the First Round in 1979. Beccles were champions of Division One in 2001–02 and won the Suffolk Senior Cup for the third time in 2009, beating Crane Sports 1–0.

Honours
Norfolk & Suffolk League
Champions 1952–53
Anglian Combination
Division One champions 2001–02
Division Three champions 1971–72
Suffolk Senior Cup
Winners 1919–20, 1921–22, 2008–09
Suffolk Junior Cup
Winners 1938–39
Suffolk Minor Cup
Winners 1947–48, 1948–49

Records
Best FA Cup performance: Third qualifying round, 1952–53, 1954–55, 1955–56
Best FA Vase performance: First round, 1978–79

References

External links
Official website

Football clubs in England
Football clubs in Suffolk
Association football clubs established in 1919
1919 establishments in England
East Anglian League
Norfolk & Suffolk League
Anglian Combination
Beccles